Arachniodes squamulosa is a species of fern in the family Dryopteridaceae. It is endemic to Ecuador.  Its natural habitats are subtropical or tropical moist lowland forests and subtropical or tropical moist montane forests. It is threatened by habitat loss.

References

Dryopteridaceae
Ferns of Ecuador
Endemic flora of Ecuador
Ferns of the Americas
Endangered flora of South America
Taxonomy articles created by Polbot